The rotating cell biofilm reactor (RCBR) is a new type of biological process based on biofilm active sludge used in wastewaters treatment. RCBR reactors represent an evolution of rotating biological contactors plants: in fact, they are able to develop about ten times the biological surface of rotating biological contactors plants, considering the same biological reactors volume (made of the set of disks). Such a result is obtained using – instead of a set of disks fixed on the central structured tree – many tridimensional plastic elements as carriers. These carriers are used to furnish the necessary biological surface for the cohesion of the bacterial film, responsible of the depuration process. These plastic elements are contained in a cilindric permeable cell, which is like the shape of the reactor cell of a traditional rotating RBC plant. One of the main peculiarity of the RCBR plant is represented by the fact that the biological carriers are common recycled water bottle plastic caps.

The intrinsic message of this technology is obvious: “transform a waste into a resource for the environment”.

After a first settling and/or screening treatment, wastewaters to be treated (civil, industrial, domestic) are pumped into RCBR modules. By the wastewaters contact, plastic caps are covered by a bacterial biological film. Bacteria are nourished by the organic substance dissolved into the water, purifying it. Purified waters can be drained on a surface body water or on the ground. If they are conveniently disinfected and complementing the modules with a tertiary depuration plant, these waters can be used to irrigate, to full the toilets, to wash objects and streets.

Functioning 
A stainless steel cell, full of plastic caps of different dimension, slowly rotates (1–3 rpm) partially submerged inside a tank, where there are wastewaters to be purified. Plastic caps spontaneously form a bacterial film that progressively presents, at first, heterotrophic bacteria development which are able to nourish of organic carbon pollutants; then the decrease of COD and BOD concentration and then the development of autotrophic bacteria. They belong to the nitrosomonas and nitrobacter category and they are able to oxidize ammonium, transforming it into nitrites and nitrates.
The cell containing the carriers (caps) can be flooded as needed; in this way the depuration process control is obtained and it can be oriented both to the carbon removal both to the wastewaters denitrification. These plants, like happening for the biological disks, do not need any blower for the bacteria film oxygenation. It's the slow reactor rotation – alternatively submerged into sewage and into atmosphere – to guarantee the adequate oxygen supply for the oxidation aerobically of the sewage made by the biological film attached to the carriers. In this way it is possible to obtain a huge reduction of functioning and operating treatment costs.

Configuration 
RCBR technology is an entirely water biological treatment system, able to make more compact and efficient the biology of any wastewaters treatment plant. For the depuration of urban wastewaters it is placed downline of primary treatments (screening, oil separation, degritting, primary settling) and upline of water physical or chemical disinfection tertiary treatments (ultraviolets, ozone). This system offers the chance to realize into restrained spaces a huge surface of cohesion for the bacteria colonies, which are active for the depuration; this aspect makes it particularly suitable also for the nitrogen removal from wastewaters, in nitro-denitro configuration. Matching a series of more modules, some of them totally submerged by the wastewaters (in anoxic conditions) operate as denitrification stadium. Others, only partially submerged into the wastewaters, in presence of oxygen, operate the carbon removal and, at the same time, the ammonium nitrification. The system simplicity and the efficiency demonstrated in the tearing down also high elevations of suspended solid and organic carbon, make it usable as a pre-treatment, upline of drinkable systems of superficial and underground polluted waters (rivers, drains, stratum, ponds and temporary puddles of rain water).

Consumption and maintenance 
This biofilm system does not need any blower to oxygenate the bacteria colonies. It's the simple cell rotation to produce the oxygenation by simple diffusion. The energetic costs of this technology are really cheap and they are related only to the rotational movement impressed by an electric engine to the reaction cell, to maintain the device in a slow movement. The application of RCBR technology generally gets a reduction of the 90% of the water treatment electrical costs, with a medium consumption of 0.25 kWh per cubic meter of purified water.
RCBR's low consumption makes very easy to match these plants with renewable energy, like photovoltaic or aeolian plants. RCBR devices'  mechanical plant does not need any important operations of routine maintenance or any specialized technical expertise to control their operation. In fact, just the common greasing of the cell supporting rotation is requested.

The invention 
RCBR is an invention of Italian chemist Sergio Modenese. The first patent of the RCBR technology was registered in July 2013, by an innovative startup from Trentino Alto Adige, of whom the inventor is one of the founder partners.

References
 Mynewsdesk – http://www.mynewsdesk.com/se/pressreleases/italy-a-headliner-at-world-water-week-with-start-up-eco-sistemi-1047043
 http://us5.campaign-archive2.com/?u=968ec920a2bde954766c459dc&id=081a427821&e=

Environmental engineering
Water treatment